The 1951 Little League World Series was held from August 21 to August 25 in Williamsport, Pennsylvania. The Stamford Little League of Stamford, Connecticut, defeated the Austin Little League of Austin, Texas, in the championship game of the 5th Little League World Series.

Attendees at the championship game included Baseball Hall of Fame inductee Cy Young, and Notre Dame football head coach Frank Leahy.

Teams

Championship Bracket

References

External links
 1951 Tournament Bracket via Wayback Machine
 1951 Line Scores via Wayback Machine

Little League World Series
Little League World Series
Little League World Series